Retretti was a major art museum in Punkaharju, Finland. It was unique in that most of its exhibition space was underground.

There was a souvenir shop and a restaurant in the premises.

Retretti Oy went into bankruptcy in autumn 2012. A new company now operates an art venture in Savonlinna city centre under the name Retretti, but reopening the underground exhibition spaces was not a priority  in 2013.

External links

 Retretti homepage in English

Art museums and galleries in Finland
Punkaharju
Museums in South Savo